Atjuri Union is an Union parishad of Mollahat Upazila, Bagerhat District in Khulna Division of Bangladesh. It has an area of 47.63 km2 (18.39 sq mi) and a population of 26,230.

References

Unions of Mollahat Upazila
Unions of Bagerhat District
Unions of Khulna Division